Arctosa is a genus of wolf spiders first described by Carl Ludwig Koch in 1847.  it contains 169 species.

Species

 Arctosa albida (Simon, 1898)
 Arctosa albopellita (L. Koch, 1875)
 Arctosa algerina Roewer, 1960
 Arctosa aliusmodi (Karsch, 1880)
 Arctosa alluaudi Guy, 1966
 Arctosa alpigena (Doleschall, 1852)
 Arctosa ambigua Denis, 1947
 Arctosa amylaceoides (Schenkel, 1936)
 Arctosa andina (Chamberlin, 1916)
 Arctosa astuta (Gerstäcker, 1873)
 Arctosa atriannulipes (Strand, 1906)
 Arctosa atroventrosa (Lenz, 1886)
 Arctosa aussereri (Keyserling, 1877)
 Arctosa bacchabunda (Karsch, 1884)
 Arctosa bakva (Roewer, 1960)
 Arctosa berlandi (Caporiacco, 1949)
 Arctosa bicoloripes (Roewer, 1960)
 Arctosa biseriata Roewer, 1960
 Arctosa bogotensis (Keyserling, 1877)
 Arctosa brauni (Strand, 1916)
 Arctosa brevispina (Lessert, 1915)
 Arctosa camerunensis Roewer, 1960
 Arctosa capensis Roewer, 1960
 Arctosa chungjooensis Paik, 1994
 Arctosa cinerea (Fabricius, 1777)
 Arctosa coreana Paik, 1994
 Arctosa daisetsuzana (Saito, 1934)
 Arctosa danzhounensis Barrion, Barrion-Dupo & Heong, 2013
 Arctosa darountaha Roewer, 1960
 Arctosa denticulata Jiménez & Dondale, 1984
 Arctosa depectinata (Bösenberg & Strand, 1906)
 Arctosa depuncta (O. Pickard-Cambridge, 1876)
 Arctosa deserta (O. Pickard-Cambridge, 1872)
 Arctosa dissonans (O. Pickard-Cambridge, 1872)
 Arctosa ebicha Yaginuma, 1960
 Arctosa edeana Roewer, 1960
 Arctosa emertoni Gertsch, 1934
 Arctosa ephippiata Roewer, 1960
 Arctosa epiana (Berland, 1938)
 Arctosa erythraeana Roewer, 1960
 Arctosa excellens (Simon, 1876)
 Arctosa fessana Roewer, 1960
 Arctosa figurata (Simon, 1876)
 Arctosa frequentissima Caporiacco, 1947
 Arctosa fujiii Tanaka, 1985
 Arctosa fulvolineata (Lucas, 1846)
 Arctosa fusca (Keyserling, 1877)
 Arctosa gougu Chen & Song, 1999
 Arctosa hallasanensis Paik, 1994
 Arctosa harraria Roewer, 1960
 Arctosa hikosanensis Tanaka, 1985
 Arctosa himalayensis Tikader & Malhotra, 1980
 Arctosa hottentotta Roewer, 1960
 Arctosa humicola (Bertkau, 1880)
 Arctosa hunanensis Yin, Peng & Bao, 1997
 Arctosa inconspicua (Bryant, 1948)
 Arctosa indica Tikader & Malhotra, 1980
 Arctosa insignita (Thorell, 1872)
 Arctosa intricaria (C. L. Koch, 1847)
 Arctosa ipsa (Karsch, 1879)
 Arctosa janetscheki Buchar, 1976
 Arctosa kadjahkaia Roewer, 1960
 Arctosa kansuensis (Schenkel, 1936)
 Arctosa kassenjea (Strand, 1913)
 Arctosa kawabe Tanaka, 1985
 Arctosa kazibana Roewer, 1960
 Arctosa keniana (Roewer, 1960)
 Arctosa keumjeungsana Paik, 1994
 Arctosa khudiensis (Sinha, 1951)
 Arctosa kiangsiensis (Schenkel, 1963)
 Arctosa kirkiana (Strand, 1913)
 Arctosa kiwuana (Strand, 1913)
 Arctosa kolosvaryi (Caporiacco, 1947)
 Arctosa kwangreungensis Paik & Tanaka, 1986
 Arctosa labiata Tso & Chen, 2004
 Arctosa laccophila (Simon, 1910)
 Arctosa lacupemba (Roewer, 1960)
 Arctosa lacustris (Simon, 1876)
 Arctosa lagodechiensis Mcheidze, 1997
 Arctosa lama Dondale & Redner, 1983
 Arctosa laminata Yu & Song, 1988
 Arctosa lawrencei (Roewer, 1960)
 Arctosa leaeniformis (Simon, 1910)
 Arctosa leopardus (Sundevall, 1833)
 Arctosa lesserti Reimoser, 1934
 Arctosa letourneuxi (Simon, 1885)
 Arctosa lightfooti (Purcell, 1903)
 Arctosa litigiosa Roewer, 1960
 Arctosa littoralis (Hentz, 1844)
 Arctosa liujiapingensis Yin, Peng, Xie, Bao & Wang, 1997
 Arctosa lutetiana (Simon, 1876)
 Arctosa maculata (Hahn, 1822)
 Arctosa maderana Roewer, 1960
 Arctosa marfieldi Roewer, 1960
 Arctosa marocensis Roewer, 1960
 Arctosa meinerti (Thorell, 1875)
 Arctosa meitanensis Yin, Wang, Xie & Peng, 1993
 Arctosa minuta F. O. Pickard-Cambridge, 1902
 Arctosa mittensa Yin, Wang, Xie & Peng, 1993
 Arctosa mossambica Roewer, 1960
 Arctosa mulani (Dyal, 1935)
 Arctosa nava Roewer, 1955
 Arctosa niccensis (Strand, 1907)
 Arctosa ningboensis Yin, Bao & Zhang, 1996
 Arctosa nivosa (Purcell, 1903)
 Arctosa nonsignata Roewer, 1960
 Arctosa nyembeensis (Strand, 1916)
 Arctosa obscura Denis, 1953
 Arctosa oneili (Purcell, 1903)
 Arctosa otaviensis Roewer, 1960
 Arctosa pardosina (Simon, 1898)
 Arctosa pargongensis Paik, 1994
 Arctosa pelengea Roewer, 1960
 Arctosa perita (Latreille, 1799)
 Arctosa personata (L. Koch, 1872)
 Arctosa pichoni Schenkel, 1963
 Arctosa picturella (Strand, 1906)
 Arctosa poecila Caporiacco, 1939
 Arctosa politana Roewer, 1960
 Arctosa promontorii (Pocock, 1900)
 Arctosa pseudoleopardus Ponomarev, 2007
 Arctosa pugil (Bertkau, 1880)
 Arctosa pungcheunensis Paik, 1994
 Arctosa quadripunctata (Lucas, 1846)
 Arctosa quinquedens Dhali, Roy, Sen, Saha & Raychaudhuri, 2012
 Arctosa raptor (Kulczyński, 1885)
 Arctosa ravida Ponomarev, 2007
 Arctosa recurva Yu & Song, 1988
 Arctosa renidescens Buchar & Thaler, 1995
 Arctosa ripaecola (Roewer, 1960)
 Arctosa rubicunda (Keyserling, 1877)
 Arctosa rufescens Roewer, 1960
 Arctosa sanctaerosae Gertsch & Wallace, 1935
 Arctosa sandeshkhaliensis Majumder, 2004
 Arctosa sapiranga Silva & Lise, 2009
 Arctosa schensiensis Schenkel, 1963
 Arctosa schweinfurthi (Strand, 1906)
 Arctosa scopulitibiis (Strand, 1906)
 Arctosa serii Roth & Brown, 1976
 Arctosa serrulata Mao & Song, 1985
 Arctosa similis Schenkel, 1938
 Arctosa simoni Guy, 1966
 Arctosa sjostedti Roewer, 1960
 Arctosa sordulenta (Thorell, 1899)
 Arctosa springiosa Yin, Wang, Xie & Peng, 1993
 Arctosa stigmosa (Thorell, 1875)
 Arctosa subamylacea (Bösenberg & Strand, 1906)
 Arctosa swatowensis (Strand, 1907)
 Arctosa tanakai Barrion & Litsinger, 1995
 Arctosa tappaensis Gajbe, 2004
 Arctosa tbilisiensis Mcheidze, 1946
 Arctosa tenuissima (Purcell, 1903)
 Arctosa testacea Roewer, 1960
 Arctosa togona Roewer, 1960
 Arctosa transvaalana Roewer, 1960
 Arctosa tridens (Simon, 1937)
 Arctosa tridentata Chen & Song, 1999
 Arctosa truncata Tso & Chen, 2004
 Arctosa upembana Roewer, 1960
 Arctosa vaginalis Yu & Song, 1988
 Arctosa variana C. L. Koch, 1847
 Arctosa villica (Lucas, 1846)
 Arctosa virgo (Chamberlin, 1925)
 Arctosa wittei Roewer, 1960
 Arctosa workmani (Strand, 1909)
 Arctosa xunyangensis Wang & Qiu, 1992
 Arctosa yasudai (Tanaka, 2000)
 Arctosa zhaojingzhaoi Li, 2016
 Arctosa ziyunensis Yin, Peng & Bao, 1997

References

External links 

 
Araneomorphae genera
Cosmopolitan spiders